The Diduni or Dunii were a Germanic tribe mentioned only by the 2nd century geographer Claudius Ptolemy. They apparently dwelt near the Asciburgius mountains which correspond to the north central parts of Sudetes in western-southern Poland. 
According to Ptolemy, they were part of the larger tribal group, the Lugii.  The Diduni are may be connected to the town of Iugidunum, which Ptolemy places in the same area as he places the tribe.

See also
List of ancient Germanic peoples

Early Germanic peoples
Lugii